The Oklahoma Center for the Advancement of Science and Technology (OCAST) is the agency of the government of Oklahoma that is responsible for technology-based economic development. Under the supervision of the Oklahoma Secretary of Science and Innovation, OCAST is responsible for fostering innovation in existing and developing business by supporting basic and applied research. The Center is led by 21-member Board of Directors, each either appointed by the Governor of Oklahoma, with the approval of the Oklahoma Senate, or ex officio members.

The current Cabinet Secretary is Dr. Kayse Shrum, who was appointed by Governor Kevin Stitt in March 2019. Under the Secretary's supervision, the Center's Executive Director is responsible for the day-to-day administration of the Center's programs.

The Center was created in 1987 during the term of Governor Henry Bellmon.

Leadership
The Center is overseen by the Oklahoma Secretary of Science and Innovation.

Board of Directors

OCAST is governed by the Oklahoma Science and Technology Research and Development (OSTRaD) Board of Directors (Title 74, Section 5060.6). This 9-member board of directors consists of the State Secretary of Science and Innovation as the OSTRaD board chair with four members appointed by the governor and two each by the state senate and house. 

As of May 2022, the following are the current members of the Board:
Elizabeth Pollard - Chair, Secretary of Science and Innovation
Blayne Arthur - Secretary of Agriculture
Sean Bauman - President and CEO of IMMY
David Ingram - Director Phillips 66
Thomas Kupiec - ARL / DNA Solutions / Kupiec Group
Dan Marticello - CymSTAR, Broken Arrow
Zacharay Miles - Oklahoma State University, Stillwater
Jeff McCormack - Oklahoma Christian University, Oklahoma City
Brenda Rolls - Frontier Electronic Systems, Stillwater

Organization
Cabinet Secretary
Board of Directors
Executive Director
Director
Programs Division
Administration and Finance Division
Technology Information Services Division

Programs
The center offers numerous programs to assist the development of the state's economy:
Research Funding Programs
Oklahoma Health Research program
Health Research Postdoctoral Fellowship program
Oklahoma Applied Research Support program
Faculty and Student Intern Partnerships program
Oklahoma Plant Science (Basic) Program
Business Assistance Programs
Inventors Assistance Service
Oklahoma Manufacturing Alliance
Small Business Innovation Research/Small Business Technology Transfer program
Oklahoma Seed Capital Fund
Technology Business Finance Program
innovation to Enterprise (i2E)

Supporting agencies
Oklahoma Applied Research Committee
Oklahoma Health Research Committee
Oklahoma Plant Sciences Research Advisory Committee
Seed Capital Investment Committee
Small Business Research Assistance Committee
Oklahoma Science and Technology Research and Development Board

References

External links 
 Oklahoma Center for the Advancement of Science and Technology official website

Science and Technology, Center for the Advancement of